William John Dees (28 September 1874 – 18 October 1940) was a boxer from England. He won the Amateur Boxing Association of England's middleweight championship in 1897, and was the heavyweight champion in 1900. He represented Great Britain at the 1908 Olympic Games in London in 1908. In 1935, as president of the Amateur Boxing Association, he sailed from Southampton to New York with the Golden Gloves Boxing Association. In October 1940, during the Blitz, Dees was killed by bombs in his home in Deptford, south London, aged 66.

References

1874 births
1940 deaths
Heavyweight boxers
Middleweight boxers
Boxers at the 1908 Summer Olympics
England Boxing champions
Olympic boxers of Great Britain
English male boxers
British civilians killed in World War II
Deaths by airstrike during World War II